Government Royapettah Hospital is a major state-owned hospital situated in Royapettah in Chennai, India.  The hospital with 712 beds is funded and managed by the state government of Tamil Nadu. It was founded in 1911 and is attached to Directorate of Medical Education. It is the city's largest peripheral hospital, and its limit extends up to Chengalpattu.

History
The Government Royapettah Hospital was opened in 1911. The first superintendent of the hospital was Col. C. Donovan. The cancer treatment centre at the hospital's annexure building was constructed for  170 million. The centre is the first exclusive government-run facility for cancer care in the state.

The hospital is the second in the government sector, after the Rajiv Gandhi Government General Hospital, to have a full-fledged emergency department, which includes triage area, resuscitation bay and colour-coded zones, per the Tamil Nadu Accident and Emergency Care Initiative (TAEI) guidelines.

In 2021, the hospital performed its first tumor-removal keyhole surgery.

Future developments
In 2011, as part of its centenary celebration, the Central Government funded the hospital a sum of  43.5 million to construct two additional floors in its Accident and Trauma Block. There was also a proposal for setting up a "Zero Delay Ward". The state government funded  10 million on the new surgical block. The casualty ward is already under renovation.

See also

 Healthcare in Chennai
 Government General Hospital
 Kilpauk Medical College
 Stanley Medical College
 Government Hospital of Thoracic Medicine
 Adyar Cancer Institute
 National Institute of Siddha

References

External links
Homepage of Government Royapettah Hospital

Hospital buildings completed in 1911
Government buildings completed in 1911
1911 establishments in India
Hospitals in Chennai
Hospitals established in 1911
20th-century architecture in India